Testing the Waters is the debut album by American rap group Thirsty Fish, released March 5, 2007 on Bell Rang Records in affiliation with Project Blowed.

Release 
The water-themed album comes after Thirsty Fish member Dumbfoundead released a previous concept album in 2005, the video game themed Super Barrio Bros EP which features Psychosiz of Thirsty Fish on the track "Three Pipes Down" and Thirsty Fish's Open Mike Eagle on the track "Bosses" (alongside Alpha MC). All three members of the group appear on that album's bonus track "Shit Talkers".

Reception 
Generally regarded as a solid debut with average to above average ratings from consumers and above average to exceptional ratings from reviewers, Thirsty Fish have since been signed to Mush Records to produce a second album, Watergate. In spite of this, however, a recurring criticism is the group's overuse of the water theme.

Track listing

References

External links 
 Project Blowed
 

Thirsty Fish albums
Concept albums
2007 debut albums
Project Blowed